Jardine River is a coastal locality split between the Shire of Cook and the Shire of Torres in Queensland, Australia.

Geography 
Most of the locality is within protected areas apart from small areas in the north and east of the locality.

History 
The locality takes its name from the river Jardine River which was originally called Deception River but was renamed by Governor of Queensland George Ferguson Bowen after Francis Lascelles Jardine and Alexander William Jardine. In 1864-1865 the Jardines overlanded stock from Rockhampton to Somerset on the Cape York Peninsula.

References 

Shire of Cook
Shire of Torres
Coastline of Queensland
Localities in Queensland